Christian magic may refer to:

 Esoteric Christianity
 Gospel magic, the use of stage magic to promote a Christian message
 Christian views on magic
 Christianity and neopaganism

See also
 Enochian magic (angelic magic)
 Goetia (demonic magic)
 Islam and magic
 Jewish magic
 Thaumaturgy (miraculous magic)
 Theurgy (divine magic)